Ahmad Ali Ibrahim (born  February 18, 1992) is a Lebanese professional basketball player who plays for Lebanese club Dynamo.  He was a member of the Lebanon national basketball team for the 2010 William Jones Cup. During the 2012 off-season, Ahmad left the Rice Owls to pursue a professional career in Lebanon.

High school
During 2008–09, he attended The Patterson School in Lenoir, North Carolina. However, the school closed for funding reasons in 2009. For his junior year, he attended Mountain State Academy and for his senior year, he attended Christian Life Center Academy in Humble, Texas. As a senior, he averaged 18 points, nine rebounds and four assists while seeing playing time at all three perimeter positions. He helped lead his high school team to a 30-5 record.

Youth national team (U-18)
During the FIBA Asia Under-18 Championship 2008, Ahmad was then 16. He averaged 32.6 points per game during that tournament.  Ibrahim is considered as future hope of Lebanese basketball. Ahmad also played in the 2010 FIBA Asia Under-18 Championship.

Rice University
Ahmad committed to the Rice Owls. In 33 games, he averaged 6.2ppg, 1.9rpg, and 1.0apg.

Personal life

Ahmad is the cousin of fellow Lebanese basketball player Mohammed Ibrahim.

References

External links 
Profile at Eurobasket.com
Rice bio

1992 births
Living people
Lebanese men's basketball players
Rice Owls men's basketball players
Small forwards
Shooting guards
Al Riyadi Club Beirut basketball players